Li Fei'er (born Li Fei; 3 October, 1987), also known as Monica Li, is a Chinese actress and singer. After completing filming for her scenes in Royal Tramp, Li briefly trained in singing and dancing at now-defunct South Korean record label Good Entertainment in 2007.

Career

In 2006, at the age of nineteen, Li made her acting debut in the historical television series The Secret History of Kangxi, playing the role of Princess Duan Min.

In 2007, after completion of filming for the wuxia drama Royal Tramp, Li went to South Korea and signed with Good Entertainment for singing and dancing training. However, she never debuted as an idol after refusing to undergo rhinoplasty as instructed by her agency and subsequently returned to China. In December the same year, she appeared in the music video of Royal Tramp co-star Huang Xiaoming's song Anything.

In 2008, Li co-starred in the war drama Great Wharf alongside Nicky Wu and Vivian Chen. In May the same year, Royal Tramp began airing on television, in which she played one of Wei Xiaobao's seven wives, Zeng Rou.

In January 2009, Li co-starred alongside Ady An and William Feng in Four Women Conflict, where she played a cold but intelligent girl. She received critical reviews for her performance in this drama.

In May 2010, together with Bai Shan, Yue Yueli amongst others, Li co-starred in the family drama Good Wife and Mother. In July the same year, she co-starred in the period drama Republic of China Past Events directed by Yiming Lian, playing the role of Miaoyu, the most beautiful woman of Shanghai Bund. Three months later, Li co-starred with Joe Cheng in the idol drama That Love Comes, playing a store clerk. In November, she starred in the family movie Chongqing Blues. In December, Li co-starred in the comedy movie The Kidnap with Chapman To and Ye Yiqian.

In February 2011, Li co-starred in the romance movie Somebody to Love with Annie Wu and Dennis Wu. In the film, she played Jane, a newly hired production director. In March the same year, she starred in the suspense movie Together. In the film, she played Xu Xiaochun, a female college dropout. A month later on 24 April, Li participated in the third season of the Chinese variety show Dancing Miracle. Later in October, she appeared in the comedy film Scary Market, playing the role of a nitpicking cashier, Jenny.

In June 2012, Li starred in the urban emotional drama Green Porcelain, adapted from the novel of the same name, in which she played Zhou Xinran, the daughter of Zhou Yunnian, secretary of the municipal legal committee.

In April 2013, Li starred in the youth inspirational drama Happy Noodle, in which she played Zhu Lingling, the assistant to the vice chairman of the noodle shop. In August the same year, she co-starred with Nick Cheung and Eddie Peng in the action movie Unbeatable.
 
In April 2014, Li participated in the reality show Divas Hit the Road as part of the show's "Five Sisters". In September the same year, she participated in the outdoor reality show Family Go (明星家族的2天1夜), forming a "family" with Cica Zhou, Bu Xueliang, Du Haitao along with seven other members and an X guest. One month later, she starred in the modern urban drama Wonderful Family, in which she played Yan Xiaoyuan, a liar who can sacrifice everything for money.

In June 2015, Li co-starred with William Chan and Siqin Gaowa in the action movie Lost in Wrestling. In the film, she played a Hong Kong fighter Yueyue. In September the same year, Li co-starred with Lee Hyun-jae and Zheng Yuanyuan in the romantic comedy movie The Old Cinderella 2.

In January 2016, Li co-starred alongside Kimi Li and Leon Jay Williams in the romance movie For Love, where she played an intellectual youthful urban white-collar worker Liang Shuang. In March the same year, she co-starred with Park Hae-jin and Shawn Zhang in the romance drama Far Away Love, in which she played the optimistic and tough single mother Meng Chuxia. A month later, Li released a single Turn Around (转身), which will serve as the theme song of the movie The Old Cinderella 2. In May the same year, Li was invited to attend the closing ceremony and awards ceremony of the 23rd Beijing College Student Film Festival, and served as the guest of honour. In September, she appeared in the youth inspirational idol drama Boy Hood. Later in October, Li co-starred with Bao Bei'er and Jia Ling in the costume drama Happy Mitan.

In January 2017, Li participated in the ice reality show The King Of Kanone (跨界冰雪王), where she advanced to the top six. In March, Li co-starred alongside Song Minyu and Zheng Haoyuan in the costume idol drama Beauties of the King, playing the rebellious eldest daughter of an ancient security escort company.

In May 2018, Li participated in the Beijing TV-produced cross-border music reality show Crossover Singer 3 as the first guest singer. In November the same year, Li was featured in "Dream Up", the first official promotion song of the "Everyone is a Volunteer" charity project.

In January 2019, Li co-starred with Yan Yikuan in the costume drama Kunpeng and Butterfly.

Personal life
In the first half of 2007, Li was rumoured to be in a relationship with South Korean actor Kwon Sang-woo, whom she met during her brief training period in South Korea. Although the two were spotted on dates in both their respective countries, Kwon's agency denied the rumours. In December 2007, it was reported that Li was dating her Royal Tramp co-star Huang Xiaoming since July of that year.

In May 2010, Li and Huang were said to have broken up with rumours that the latter became involved with Angelababy.

Filmography

Film

Television series

Variety show

Discography

Singles

Music video

Awards and nominations

References

External links
 Feier Li on Internet Movie Database

1988 births
Living people
People from Shenyang
Chinese film actresses
Chinese television actresses
21st-century Chinese actresses
Actresses from Liaoning
Actresses from Shenyang